Stricker:

 Der Stricker, the pseudonym of a 13th-century Middle High German itinerant poet

Family name 
 Dominic Stephan Stricker (born 2002), a Swiss professional tennis player
 Eva (Amalia) Zeisel, née Stricker (born 1906), a Jewish Hungarian industrial designer
 Johannes Paulus Stricker (1816 in The Hague – 1886 in Nieuwer-Amstel), a Dutch theologian and biblical scholar
 John A. "Cub" Stricker (1859–1937), an American baseball player (second baseman)
 John Stricker (1758–1825), a Maryland militia officer
 Karol Stricker (born 1959 in Buffalo, NY)
 Katy Hamman Stricker
 Erwin Stricker, an Italian skier
 Katy Hamman-Stricker Library
 Louis Anthony Stricker (1884 in Kimberley, South Africa – 1960 in Rondebosch, Cape Province)
 Robert Stricker (1879 in Brno – 1944 in Auschwitz), a Jewish Czech-Austrian politician
 Salomon Stricker (1834 in Waag-Neustadtl/Vágújhely – 1898), a Jewish Hungarian-Austrian pathologist, histologist
 Steven "Steve" Charles Stricker (born 1967), an American professional golfer
 Tal Stricker (born 1979 in Ramat Gan), an Israeli Olympic breaststroke swimmer
 Herbert Stricker (born 1928 in Ontario), a civil engineer, urban developer, and athlete for the Toronto Argos and Toronto Blue Jays,

Other 
 Stricker's Grove, a small amusement park in Ross, Ohio, USA
 Rock Creek Station and Stricker Homesite

German-language surnames
Jewish surnames